Ellen Helga Louise Hagen (née Wadström; 1873–1967) was a Swedish suffragette, women's rights activist and politician. She was a member of the National Association for Women's Suffrage, the chairperson of Liberala kvinnor (Liberal Women) in 1938–1946 and Svenska Kvinnors Medborgarförbund (Swedish Women's Citizen Society) in 1936–1963. During the 1920s and 1930s, she was internationally active within peace work and the Swedish delegate in the international peace conference in Paris in 1931.

Life
Hagen was born on 15 September 1873 in Stockholm, Sweden. She was the daughter of the priest and writer Bernhard Wadström and Helga Westdahl (1838–1879), and the sister of the writer Frida Stéenhoff. In 1896 she married Roger Hagen, governor of Gävleborg country. She was the mother of ambassador Tord Hagen.

She was active as a speaker for Country Association for Women's Suffrage. She is described as a skillful speaker, and her contribution was appreciated: by her connections, the movement gained supporters from the upper class, who would not otherwise be willing to listen to a speech about women suffrage, and by her glamorous way of dressing, she proved wrong the caricature of a suffragette as "masculine". Women suffrage was achieved in 1919.

After the death of her spouse in 1922, she was proposed by the government to succeed him as governor of Gävleborg country, though this did not come about. In 1923, she became the launching editor of a Swedish liberal feminist magazine, Tidevarvet.

Hagen died on 28 January 1967 in Stockholm.

Sources

Further reading
 Barbro Hedvall (2011). Susanna Eriksson Lundqvist. red.. Vår rättmätiga plats. Om kvinnornas kamp för rösträtt. Förlag Bonnier. 
 Hagen's biography at University of Gothenburg (Swedish)
 
 

1873 births
1967 deaths
Politicians from Stockholm
Swedish suffragists
Swedish women's rights activists
20th-century Swedish women politicians
20th-century Swedish politicians
Burials at Uppsala old cemetery
19th-century Swedish women politicians
19th-century Swedish politicians